The Department of Atomic Energy Malaysia (Atom Malaysia) or formerly known as Atomic Energy Licensing Board or in Malay known as Lembaga Perlesenan Tenaga Atom (AELB) is a government agency under the Ministry of Science, Technology & Innovation (MOSTI) that is responsible for the regulation of atomic energy activities in Malaysia as stipulated in the Atomic Energy Licensing Act 1984 (Act 304). 

*the change of name from AELB to Atom Malaysia is entered into action in June 2022 due to the approval granted by the Public Service Department (JPA) of Malaysia for the rebranding of AELB to become the Department of Atomic Energy (Atom Malaysia). 

Atom Malaysia is led by a Director General, current Director General from August 2021 until September 2022 is Ts. Hj. Hasmadi bin Hassan. Atom Malaysia is a regulatory authority that operates from its headquarters in Dengkil, Selangor and its four branches around Malaysia, namely in the Penang state (has relocated to Kedah state since October 2022), Johor state, Terengganu State and Sarawak, all of which are responsible in licensing processes and enforcement activities related to radioactivity and nuclear (atomic energy).

Establishment 
Control over the use of radioactive substances began in 1968, when Parliament passed the Radioactive Substances Act 1968. Due to the rapid development and utilization of atomic energy activities in Malaysia, in which requires more effective regulatory control, inspection and enforcement, the Atomic Energy Licensing Bill was drafted. This bill was then passed in Parliament in April 1984, as the Atomic Energy Licensing Act (Act 304). In line with Section 3 of the Act 304, Atomic Energy Licensing Board (AELB) was established under the Prime Minister's Department on 1 February 1985. AELB acts as an enforcement authority for the implementation of the Act. However, on 27 October 1990, AELB was then placed under the Ministry of Science, Technology and Innovation.

Today in 2022, AELB is renamed to be the Department of Atomic Energy (Atom Malaysia) due to the fact that since its establishment in 1985, this department is not known to have a name of its own. The Atomic Energy Licensing Board, whereby the "Board" by all definition only refers to the 5 board members. At the same time the Director General of this department also acts as an Executive Secretary to this Board.

Objectives
To ensure all Atomic Energy Activities are Safe, Secured and Safeguarded (3S's) for protecting the Public, Workers and Environment.

Mission 
To regulate the use of atomic energy for nation's wealth and well being.

Vision 
An effective regulatory body for Safety, Security and Safeguards in atomic energy activities.

Function 
Atom Malaysia's functions as set forth in Act 304 are as follows:

- To advise the Minister and the Government of Malaysia on matters relating to the Atomic Energy Licensing Act 1984 and the progress of its development particularly on the implications of the development for Malaysia;

- Controlling and monitoring the activity of atomic energy and the matters incidental thereto;

- To establish, maintain and develop scientific cooperation with any body, institution or other organization relating to nuclear matters or atomic energy as the Board deems fit for the purposes of the Atomic Energy Licensing Act 1984;

- Where so directed by the Government of Malaysia, to implement or provide for the execution of obligations arising out of agreements, conventions or treaties relating to nuclear or atomic matters of which Malaysia is a party if the treaty, convention or treaty is connected with the purpose - the Atomic Energy Licensing Act 1984; and

- To do other matters arising or arising out of the functions of this Board under the Atomic Energy Licensing Act 1984 which is not contrary to the meaning of the Act, whether directed or not directed by the Minister.

References

External links 
 Official Website of Atomic Energy Licensing Board, Malaysia  (AELB)
 Official Facebook of Atomic Energy Licensing Board, Malaysia  (AELB)

Ministry of Energy, Technology, Science, Climate Change and Environment (Malaysia)
Nuclear regulatory organizations